William Pellett (7 July 1809 – date of death unknown) was an English cricketer.  Pellett's batting and bowling styles are unknown.  He was born at Duncton, Sussex.

Pellett made his first-class debut for Sussex against Nottinghamshire at the Royal New Ground, Brighton, in 1837.  He made two further first-class appearances for the Sussex in that season, against the Marylebone Cricket Club at the Royal New Ground, and a return fixture against Nottinghamshire at the Forest New Ground, Nottingham.  In his three first-class matches, he scored a total of just 26 runs at an average of 4.33, with a high score of 12.

References

External links
William Pellett at ESPNcricinfo
William Pellett at CricketArchive

1809 births
Year of death unknown
People from Duncton
English cricketers
Sussex cricketers
English cricketers of 1826 to 1863